John T. Brown (March 14, 1876 – January 18, 1951) was an American politician who served as the 42nd lieutenant governor of Ohio from 1929 to 1931 serving under Governor Myers Y. Cooper.

Biography
Brown was born in Plain City, Madison County, Ohio.  He was a Republican and a Methodist.

He died January 18, 1951, in Madison County, Ohio, of congestive heart failure.

References

1876 births
1951 deaths
Lieutenant Governors of Ohio
Methodists from Ohio